The 2008 Libertarian National Convention was held from May 22 to May 26, 2008 at the Sheraton Hotel (formerly the Adam's Mark Hotel) in Denver, Colorado. The delegates at the convention, on behalf of the U.S. Libertarian Party, nominated Bob Barr for president and Wayne Allyn Root for vice president in the 2008 presidential election. The convention was televised nationally on C-SPAN.

Libertarians hold a national convention every two years to vote on party bylaws, platform and resolutions and elect national party officers and a judicial committee. Every four years it nominates presidential and vice presidential candidates.

The theme of this convention was A Better Choice for America.

Two non-binding primaries preceded the convention.

Platform

In 2006 the self-styled Libertarian Party "reformers" at the National Convention in Portland, Oregon took out 46 platform planks detailing party positions, leaving just fifteen. In 2008 more "radical" libertarians attempted to restore that platform. They did not succeed, but they narrowly prevented the reformers from softening the language of the non-aggression principle in the party's “Statement of Principles”. The revised platform did replace the plank on secession, deleted in 2006, with a definition of self-determination drawn from the Declaration of Independence: "Whenever any form of government becomes destructive of individual liberty, it is the right of the people to alter or to abolish it, and to agree to such new governance as to them shall seem most likely to protect their liberty."

Presidential candidates

Voting for presidential nomination

First ballot
After the first round, six of the eight candidates running moved on to the second round of voting. Mike Jingozian and Christine Smith were both eliminated due to their small percentage of votes. Jingozian endorsed former Senator Mike Gravel, and Smith presented a speech attacking Bob Barr after the results were announced.

Second ballot
After the second round, five of the six candidates running moved on to the third ballot. Steve Kubby, after receiving only 5% of the total vote, dropped out of the race and endorsed Dr. Mary Ruwart.

Third ballot
After the third round of voting, four of the five remaining candidates moved on to the fourth ballot. Dr. George Phillies was eliminated after receiving approximately 5% of the vote.

Fourth ballot
After the fourth vote, three of the four candidates went on to the fifth round of voting. Fmr. Sen. Mike Gravel was eliminated after not getting a sufficient number of votes, and subsequently announced that his political career was over.

Fifth ballot
After the fifth ballot, the final two of three candidates continued on to the sixth ballot. Wayne Allyn Root was therefore eliminated, and after the vote, he made a speech endorsing Barr and stating that he would like to be Barr's candidate for vice-president. Barr and Root then stated that they would run together.

Sixth ballot
With only Barr and Ruwart remaining on the ballot, Barr received 324 votes to Ruwart's 276 and 26 NOTA. Barr thus won the nomination with 51.8% of the final vote.

Ruwart made a concession speech following the announcement of the results with her campaign staff on the stage.

Voting for vice presidential nomination
A separate vote was held for the vice presidential nomination. Presidential nominee Barr endorsed Root, while Presidential runner-up Ruwart endorsed Kubby.

First ballot
After the first ballot, three of the six active candidates running moved on to the second ballot.

Second ballot
After the second ballot, Wayne Allyn Root was nominated as the vice presidential candidate, prevailing by a difference of 30 votes over Steve Kubby, and 279 votes over Daniel Williams.

See also
 2008 United States third-party presidential candidates
 Libertarian Party of Colorado
 Other 2008 American political conventions
 Green Party
 Democratic Party
 Republican Party

References

External links

 
 LP News (January 2007)
 
 "Freedom Freaks" published by The New Republic

Libertarian Party (United States) National Conventions
2008 United States presidential election
Libertarian National Convention
2000s in Denver
Political conventions in Colorado
2008 conferences
May 2008 events in the United States
Conventions in Denver